Roopam Sharma,   (born 24 May 1995) is an Indian scientist. He is best known for his work on Manovue, a technology which enables the visually impaired to read printed text. His research interests include Wearable Computing, Mobile Application Development, Human Centered Design, Computer Vision, AI and Cognitive Science. Roopam was recently awarded the Gifted Citizen Prize 2016  and has been listed as one of the top 8 Innovators Under 35 by the MIT Technology Review for the year 2016 in India. In 2018, he was honoured as part of Asia's 21 Young Leaders Initiative in Manila.

Early life, education and research
Roopam was born on May 24, 1995 in Faridabad, Haryana, India to Nirmal and Krishna Dutt Sharma. He has a brother Rahul and a sister Priyanka. He is an alumnus of Ryan International School, Faridabad and Modern Vidya Niketan, Faridabad and went on to study Bachelors of Technology in Computer Science and Engineering at Manav Rachna University in Faridabad, Haryana. Roopam began his research during his sophomore year of undergraduate school at Manav Rachna University.

Inventions
Roopam's project Manovue, developed by Eyeluminati, is the world's first intelligent personal assisting system for the visually impaired. The technology has three main functions: to enable the user to read printed text by simply pointing over the text; to help the user to navigate freely outside well known environment through haptic feedback; and to use a completely voice-controlled mobile phone application.

Manovue was awarded as the winner of  the Microsoft Imagine Cup 2015 and Yahoo Accenture Innovation Jockeys season 4. He was listed on the MIT Tech Review 35 under 35 list in 2016.

Awards and achievements

Roopam was recently awarded the Gifted Citizen Prize 2016. He has also been listed as an innovator under 35 in 2016 by the Technology Review. Roopam was also named as a judge for the Living Talent Masterpiece 2017 and  Accenture Innovation Jockeys Season 6.

The following is the list of notable awards and achievements received:

References and notes

External links

 

1995 births
Indian philanthropists
Indian humanitarians
Living people
Indian computer scientists
21st-century Indian inventors